Alberto Junior Rodríguez Valdelomar, nicknamed El mudo (mute) (born 31 March 1984), is a Peruvian professional footballer who plays as a central defender.

Club career
Born in Lima, Rodríguez joined Sporting Cristal's youth system at the age of 16. He never appeared in less than 30 Primera División matches over four full seasons, with the capital side winning three Clausura titles.

On 28 December 2006, Rodríguez signed a three-and-a-half-year deal with Primeira Liga club S.C. Braga and, on 18 February 2007, played his first league match against U.D. Leiria. He finished his first season in Portugal with nine appearances, helping the Minho team to finish fourth.

Rodríguez was irregularly used in the following campaigns due to constant injury problems, but contributed 20 games as the team finished in a best-ever second place in 2010, adding seven in their subsequent runner-up run in the UEFA Europa League. On 27 May 2011, he agreed to a four-year contract with Sporting CP.

Under former Braga boss Domingos Paciência, Rodríguez's only season was again greatly undermined by physical problems, and he only played 13 competitive matches. In mid-July 2012 he was loaned to Deportivo de La Coruña of La Liga, moving to the Spanish club as many teammates, but returned to Lisbon after failing his medical.

On 24 July 2012, Rodríguez bought out his contract with Sporting and signed for one year with Rio Ave F.C. in the same league. After returning to his country, he represented in quick succession Sporting Cristal, FBC Melgar, Club Universitario de Deportes and Atlético Junior (Colombia).

International career
Rodríguez represented Peru during the 2006 FIFA World Cup qualifiers after winning the first of his 75 caps on 2 April 2003 in a friendly with Chile, and quickly became a defensive cornerstone for the national side. He appeared for the country at the 2007 Copa América, in an eventual quarter-final exit.

Rodríguez was also selected for the 2011 Copa América squad, being an important defensive unit as the Sergio Markarián-led team finished in third place in Argentina. At age 34, he was selected to the 2018 World Cup in Russia, making his debut in the competition on 16 June by playing the entire 1–0 group stage loss against Denmark.

Career statistics

International

Honours
Sporting Cristal
Peruvian Primera División: Clausura 2002, 2004, 2005

Braga
UEFA Intertoto Cup: 2008
UEFA Europa League runner-up: 2010–11

Sporting CP
Taça de Portugal runner-up: 2011–12

Rio Ave
Taça de Portugal runner-up: 2013–14
Taça da Liga runner-up: 2013–14

Peru
Copa América third place: 2011

References

External links

1984 births
Living people
Peruvian footballers
Footballers from Lima
Association football defenders
Peruvian Primera División players
Sporting Cristal footballers
FBC Melgar footballers
Club Universitario de Deportes footballers
Club Alianza Lima footballers
Alianza Atlético footballers
Primeira Liga players
S.C. Braga players
Sporting CP footballers
Rio Ave F.C. players
Categoría Primera A players
Atlético Junior footballers
Peru international footballers
2007 Copa América players
2011 Copa América players
Copa América Centenario players
2018 FIFA World Cup players
Peruvian expatriate footballers
Expatriate footballers in Portugal
Expatriate footballers in Colombia
Peruvian expatriate sportspeople in Portugal
Peruvian expatriate sportspeople in Colombia